Arizona State University Polytechnic campus is a public university in Mesa, Arizona. It is one of five campuses  of Arizona State University. Founded as ASU East, the campus opened in fall 1996 on the former Williams Air Force Base in southeast Mesa.

__toc__

History
The campus opened with nearly 1,000 students enrolled in one of the eight degrees offered. The campus started with two schools — the School of Technology and the School of Management and Agribusiness. East College was added in 1997 as an incubator for new professional programs.

More than 8,000 students are enrolled in 40 degree programs based on the campus. Together, these entities make up what is known as the Williams Campus.

In July 2005, the ASU campus changed its name from ASU East to ASU Polytechnic.

In the Fall 2008 semester a major expansion project at the campus was completed and open to students in the form of the new Polytechnic Academic Complex.  It is located in the heart of campus and combines new student housing with classrooms and administrative offices in an open air building environment.  The three new buildings cost a combined $103 million and cover .  It was built by main contractor DPR and designed by RSP Architects (Architect-of-Record) in collaboration with Sam Luitio-based Lake|Flato (Design Architect) and is a LEED v2.2 Gold certified project.

Academics

College of Technology and Innovation
The College has nearly 40 facilities, centers and laboratories for student work and faculty research. Facilities such as the Altitude Chamber, Flight Simulator Labs, Digital Printing Lab, Photovoltaics Testing Lab, Microelectronics Teaching Factory and Haas Technical Center. In 2013, the College of Technology and Innovation was dismantled and programs were divided into the College of Letters and Sciences and The Polytechnic School.

W.P. Carey School of Business (Morrison School of Management and Agribusiness)

The school was named in 1998 in honor of ASU Alums Marvin and June Morrison for their gift of a large acre of farmland to the school and their ongoing support of Arizona State University.

College of Letters and Sciences
The College of Letters and Sciences (CLS) offers programs on the Polytechnic campus from its headquarters on the Downtown Phoenix campus. CLS offers a liberal arts core curriculum and a university-wide bachelor's degree in interdisciplinary studies. Instruction ranges from humanities, social sciences, and natural sciences, including degrees in Applied Biological Sciences offering a variety of disciplines aimed to entice Pre-Veterinary and Wildlife majors as well as people seeking other degrees in medical fields.

Mary Lou Fulton Teachers College
The Mary Lou Fulton Teachers College offers programs leading to the B.A., M.Ed., and Ed.D. in many fields, such as early childhood education, elementary education, secondary education, special education, and educational administration/supervision. Headquartered on ASU's West campus, the Teachers College administers education programs on all four ASU campuses.

Graduate College
The Graduate College administers graduate programs on all four ASU campuses.

Honors College
The Barrett Honors College provides academically-intensive programs and courses for undergraduate students meeting select criteria. Barrett's programs are offered to students across all four ASU campuses.

University College
The University College offers general-studies programs and exploratory programs for undergraduate students who have not declared a formal major.

The Polytechnic School
The College of Technology and Innovation (CTI) was an academic unit at the Polytechnic campus. It was the sole academic unit at the campus after 2009. In 2014, the university announced that CTI would merge with the Ira A. Fulton Schools of Engineering, becoming the Polytechnic School within that academic unit.

The Polytechnic School was founded in 2013 after the dismantling of CTI, and offers 11 undergraduate degrees and 10 graduate degrees, including degrees in ASU's aviation program and algae labs offering degrees in environmental and resource management. The director of the Polytechnic School is Dr. Ann McKenna.

Residence halls 

 Palo Blanco Hall
 Lantana Hall (completed Fall 2020) 
 Century Hall (built 2012)
 Dean and Bell Halls
 Eagle Hall
 Falcon Hall
 Mustang Hall
 Phantom Hall
 Talon Hall

References

External links

Arizona State University campuses
Arizona State University Polytechnic campus
Education in Mesa, Arizona
Educational institutions established in 1996
Arizona State University Polytechnic campus
University subdivisions in Arizona
Satellite campuses
1996 establishments in Arizona
Engineering universities and colleges in Arizona